Teuvo Aura's first cabinet was a caretaker government of Finland, led by Teuvo Aura (lib.). The cabinet governed for two months, from 14 May 1970 to 15 July 1970 in the interregnum between Mauno Koivisto's first cabinet and Ahti Karjalainen's second cabinet. It did not produce a government platform.

Ministers

References

Aura
1970 establishments in Finland
1970 disestablishments in Finland
Cabinets established in 1970
Cabinets disestablished in 1970